State Road 332 (SR 332) is a part of the Indiana State Road that runs between Interstate 69 (I–69) and Muncie in US state of Indiana.  The  of SR 332 that lie within Indiana serve as a minor highway. None of the highway is listed on the National Highway System. Various sections are rural four-lane divided highway and urban four-lane highway.  The highway passes through farmland, residential and commercial properties.

Route description
SR 332 begins at an interchange with I–69, in rural  Delaware County, just east of Madison County line. West of the interchange the route is a county road, known as McGalliard Road, eventually feeding into State Road 128 at State Road 9. The route heads east towards Muncie, as a four-lane divided highway passing through farmland. The road crosses over the Norfolk Southern Railroad track and begins to enter residential properties. The highway enters Muncie and a mix of commercial and residential properties. The road enters the Ball State University campus and SR 332 ends at North Tillotson Avenue next to Ball State's Scheumann Stadium. McGalliard Road continues east through Muncie and has a traffic signal at U.S. Route 35/State Road 3/State Road 67, also known as the Muncie Bypass.

SR 332 is not included as a part of the National Highway System (NHS).  The NHS is a network of highways that are identified as being most important for the economy, mobility and defense of the nation.  The highway is maintained by the Indiana Department of Transportation (INDOT) like all other state roads in the state. The department tracks the traffic volumes along all state highways as a part of its maintenance responsibilities using a metric called average annual daily traffic (AADT). This measurement is a calculation of the traffic level along a segment of roadway for any average day of the year. In 2010, INDOT figured that lowest traffic levels were the 12,650 vehicles and 520 commercial vehicles used the highway daily near Muncie. The peak traffic volumes were 22,560 vehicles and 540 commercial vehicles AADT along the section of SR 332 between Morrison Road and Bethel Avenue, in Muncie.

Major intersections

See also
State Road 32
State Road 132
State Road 232

References

External links

332
Transportation in Delaware County, Indiana